Ochapowace 71 is an Indian reserve of the Ochapowace Nation in Saskatchewan. It is 8 kilometres northeast of Broadview. In the 2016 Canadian Census, it recorded a population of 426 living in 126 of its 138 total private dwellings. In the same year, its Community Well-Being index was calculated at 61 of 100, compared to 58.4 for the average First Nations community and 77.5 for the average non-Indigenous community.

References

Indian reserves in Saskatchewan
Division No. 5, Saskatchewan
Ochapowace Nation